Sasovsky District is an administrative and municipal district (raion), one of the twenty-five in Ryazan Oblast, Russia. It is located in the east of the oblast. Its administrative center is the town of Sasovo (which is not administratively a part of the district). Population: 18,504 (2010 Census);

Administrative and municipal status
Within the framework of administrative divisions, Sasovsky District is one of the twenty-five in the oblast. The town of Sasovo serves as its administrative center, despite being incorporated separately as a town of oblast significance—an administrative unit with the status equal to that of the districts.

As a municipal division, the district is incorporated as Sasovsky Municipal District. The town of oblast significance of Sasovo is incorporated separately from the district as Sasovo Urban Okrug.

References

Notes

Sources

Districts of Ryazan Oblast

